Wamanripa (Quechua wamanripa Senecio, "the one with the wamanripa", hispanicized spelling Huamanrripa) is a mountain in the Cordillera Central in the Andes of Peru which reaches an altitude of approximately . It is located in the Junín Region, Yauli Province, Yauli District. Wamanripa lies east of Yanta Pallana and south of a lake named Pumaqucha.

References

Mountains of Peru
Mountains of Junín Region